Clifton is a historic plantation house located near Hamilton, Cumberland County, Virginia.  It was built about 1760, and is a two-story, seven-bay frame dwelling in the Georgian style.  It has a hipped roof and a one-bay, one-story wing on the west end.  The front facade features a three-bay, one-story gable roof porch  supported by elongated Tuscan order columns.  It was the home of Carter Henry Harrison (~1727 – 1793/1794), who as a member of the Cumberland Committee of Safety, wrote the Instructions for Independence presented to the Virginia Convention of May 1776.

It was listed on the National Register of Historic Places in 1973.

References

Harrison family of Virginia
Plantation houses in Virginia
Houses on the National Register of Historic Places in Virginia
Georgian architecture in Virginia
Houses completed in 1760
Houses in Cumberland County, Virginia
National Register of Historic Places in Cumberland County, Virginia